George Rowan Nicks OBE FRACS FRCS AO (24 February 1913 - 26 May 2011) was a New Zealand surgeon. The Rowan Nicks Fellowships and Scholarships are awarded in his name by the Royal Australasian College of Surgeons.

Selected publications
 The Dance of Life: The Life and Times of an Antipodean Surgeon

References 

Fellows of the Royal Australasian College of Surgeons
New Zealand surgeons
Royal Navy officers of World War II
Members of the Order of the British Empire
New Zealand philanthropists
1913 births
2011 deaths
Fellows of the Royal College of Surgeons
University of Otago alumni
Physicians of the Middlesex Hospital
20th-century philanthropists